Portugal made its Paralympic Games début at the 1972 Summer Paralympics (two years before the Carnation Revolution), where it was represented solely by a men's team in wheelchair basketball. They were eliminated at the preliminary stage of the competition, with one victory (over Switzerland) and three defeats. Portugal was then absent from the Paralympic Games until the 1984 Summer Games, where its athletes won the country's first fourteen medals, including three gold in track and field and one in boccia. Portugal has competed at every subsequent edition of the Summer Paralympics, but -almost uniquely among Western European countries- has never taken part in the Winter Games.

Portuguese athletes have won a total of 92 Paralympic medals, of which 25 gold, 30 silver and 37 bronze. As of 2010, Portugal ranks thirty-sixth on the all-time Paralympic Games medal table. The country's best performance came in 2000, when it won 15 medals (of which 6 gold) and ranked 26th.

Medal tallies

Summer Paralympics

Medals by Summer sport
Row in gold background is a sport in which they are leading in i.e. won most world championship titles.

Medalists

See also
 Portugal at the Olympics

References